The April 2016 Idlib bombings are two separate aerial bombardments on marketplaces in the rebel-held towns of Maarrat al-Nu'man and Kafr Nabl in the Idlib Governorate of Syria. The bombings killed more than 40 civilians and was described as a massacre by the Syrian Observatory for Human Rights.

The bombings
Around noon on 19 April 2016, the marketplace near the center of Maarrat al-Nu'man was hit by an airstrike, killing more than 38 civilians and wounding others. Simultaneously, the market in the town of Kafr Nabl was bombed, killed at least 9 people.

References

Airstrikes conducted by the Syrian Air Force in the Syrian civil war
Massacres of the Syrian civil war in 2016
April 2016 crimes in Asia
Idlib Governorate in the Syrian civil war
2016 airstrikes